The 2017–18 Atlanta Hawks season was the 69th season of the franchise in the National Basketball Association (NBA) and the 50th in Atlanta. For the first time since 2013, Paul Millsap was not on the roster, as he signed with the Denver Nuggets in free agency. This was the first time the Hawks missed the playoffs since 2007, and made them the second NBA team to go 60 years without winning a title. This season would also be the last with Mike Budenholzer coaching the Hawks, as he would part with them after the season ended on April 25, 2018, later joining the Milwaukee Bucks in May.

Draft picks

Roster

<noinclude>

Standings

Division

Conference

Game log

Preseason 

|- style="background:#fcc;"
| 1
| October 1
| @ Miami
| 
| Dedmon, Schröder (12)
| John Collins (15)
| Dennis Schröder (5)
| American Airlines Arena19,600
| 0–1
|- style="background:#cfc;"
| 2
| October 4
| @ Cleveland
| 
| Dennis Schröder (13)
| Taurean Prince (8)
| Malcolm Delaney (6)
| Quicken Loans Arena18,221
| 1–1
|- style="background:#fcc;"
| 3
| October 6
| @ Detroit
| 
| Malcolm Delaney (15)
| John Collins (6)
| Malcolm Delaney (5)
| Little Caesars Arena14,496
| 1–2
|- style="background:#cfc;"
| 4
| October 9
| Memphis
| 
| Dennis Schroder (21)
| John Collins (8)
| Malcolm Delaney (5)
| McCamish Pavilion7,262
| 2–2
|- style="background:#fcc;"
| 5
| October 12
| Dallas
| 
| Kent Bazemore (20)
| Dewayne Dedmon (10)
| Kent Bazemore (5)
| McCamish Pavilion6,759
| 2–3

Regular season 

|- style="background:#cfc;"
| 1
| October 18
| @ Dallas
| 
| Dennis Schroder (28)
| Taurean Prince (10)
| Dennis Schroder (7)
| American Airlines Center19,709
| 1–0
|- style="background:#fcc;"
| 2
| October 20
| @ Charlotte
| 
| Dennis Schroder (25)
| Dewayne Dedmon (7)
| Dennis Schroder (5)
| Spectrum Center18,417
| 1–1
|- style="background:#fcc;"
| 3
| October 22
| @ Brooklyn
| 
| Marco Belinelli (31)
| John Collins (13)
| Dennis Schroder (8)
| Barclays Center13,917
| 1–2
|- style="background:#fcc;"
| 4
| October 23
| @ Miami
| 
| Bazemore, Prince (20)
| John Collins (11)
| Kent Bazemore (4)
| American Airlines Arena19,600
| 1–3
|- style="background:#fcc;"
| 5
| October 26
| @ Chicago
| 
| Marco Belinelli (23)
| Dedmon, Muscala (10)
| Dedmon, Delaney, Muscala (4)
| United Center21,104
| 1–4
|- style="background:#fcc;"
| 6
| October 27
| Denver
| 
| Dennis Schroder (20)
| Dewayne Dedmon (10)
| Dennis Schroder (6)
| Philips Arena16,220
| 1–5
|- style="background:#fcc;"
| 7
| October 29
| Milwaukee
| 
| Dennis Schroder (21)
| John Collins (7)
| Dennis Schroder (8)
| Philips Arena14,014
| 1–6

|- style="background:#fcc;"
| 8
| November 1
| @ Philadelphia
| 
| Dennis Schroder (25)
| Taurean Prince (11)
| Dennis Schroder (6)
| Wells Fargo Center20,549
| 1–7
|- style="background:#fcc;"
| 9
| November 3
| Houston
| 
| Kent Bazemore (18)
| John Collins (13)
| Isaiah Taylor (5)
| Philips Arena14,087
| 1–8
|- style="background:#cfc;"
| 10
| November 5
| @ Cleveland
| 
| Dennis Schroder (28)
| John Collins (13)
| Dennis Schroder (9)
| Wells Fargo Center20,562
| 2–8
|- style="background:#fcc;"
| 11
| November 6
| Boston
| 
| Dennis Schroder (23)
| Dewayne Dedmon (12)
| Dennis Schroder (6)
| Philips Arena13,215
| 2–9
|- style="background:#fcc;"
| 12
| November 10
| @ Detroit
| 
| Kent Bazemore (22)
| Dewayne Dedmon (9)
| Dennis Schroder (11)
| Little Caesars Arena16,687
| 2–10
|- style="background:#fcc;"
| 13
| November 11
| @ Washington
| 
| Taurean Prince (19)
| Dewayne Dedmon (8)
| Dennis Schroder (5)
| Capital One Arena17,260
| 2–11
|- style="background:#fcc;"
| 14
| November 13
| @ New Orleans
| 
| Kent Bazemore (22)
| Cavanaugh, Collins, Dedmon (6)
| Kent Bazemore (7)
| Smoothie King Center14,631
| 2–12
|- style="background:#cfc;"
| 15
| November 15
| Sacramento
| 
| Dennis Schroder (21)
| Dewayne Dedmon (14)
| Dennis Schroder (8)
| Philips Arena13,860
| 3–12
|- style="background:#fcc;"
| 16
| November 18
| Boston
| 
| Dennis Schroder (23)
| Dewayne Dedmon (8)
| Dennis Schroder (9)
| Philips Arena16,381
| 3–13
|- style="background:#fcc;"
| 17
| November 20
| @ San Antonio
| 
| Taurean Prince (18)
| Collins, Dedmon (9)
| Dennis Schroder (9)
| AT&T Center18,418
| 3–14
|- style="background:#fcc;"
| 18
| November 22
| LA Clippers
| 
| Marco Belinelli (20)
| John Collins (10)
| Dennis Schroder (7)
| Philips Arena12,675
| 3–15
|- style="background:#cfc;"
| 19
| November 24
| New York
| 
| Dennis Schroder (26)
| Taurean Prince (8)
| Dennis Schroder (8)
| Philips Arena14,355
| 4–15
|- style="background:#fcc;"
| 20
| November 25
| Toronto
| 
| Dennis Schroder (14)
| Bazemore, Bembry, Cavanaugh, Ilyasova, Schroder (4)
| Josh Magette (6)
| Philips Arena12,278
| 4–16
|- style="background:#fcc;"
| 21
| November 30
| Cleveland
| 
| Dennis Schroder (27)
| John Collins (7)
| Kent Bazemore (6)
| Philips Arena16,379
| 4–17

|- style="background:#cfc;"
| 22
| December 2
| @ Brooklyn
| 
| Dennis Schroder (24)
| Ersan Ilyasova (11)
| Dennis Schroder (6)
| Barclays Center13,949
| 5–17
|- style="background:#fcc;"
| 23
| December 4
| Brooklyn
| 
| Dennis Schroder (19)
| Miles Plumlee (7)
| Dennis Schroder (4)
| Philips Arena12,056
| 5–18
|- style="background:#fcc;"
| 24
| December 6
| @ Orlando
| 
| Dennis Schroder (26)
| Belinelli, Ilyasova (7)
| Bazemore, Schroder (7)
| Amway Center16,167
| 5–19
|- style="background:#cfc;"
| 25
| December 9
| Orlando
| 
| Ersan Ilyasova (26)
| Babbitt, Cavanaugh (8)
| Bazemore, Schroder (7)
| Philips Arena12,719
| 6–19
|- style="background:#fcc;"
| 26
| December 10
| @ New York
| 
| Dennis Schroder (21)
| Taurean Prince (8)
| Taurean Prince (5)
| Madison Square Garden19,189
| 6–20
|- style="background:#fcc;"
| 27
| December 12
| @ Cleveland
| 
| Taurean Prince (24)
| Tyler Cavanaugh (9)
| Taurean Prince (6)
| Quicken Loans Arena20,562
| 6–21
|- style="background:#fcc;"
| 28
| December 14
| Detroit
| 
| Ersan Ilyasova (23)
| John Collins (7)
| Dennis Schroder (10)
| Philips Arena13,548
| 6–22
|-style="background:#fcc;"
| 29
| December 15
| @ Memphis
| 
| Kent Bazemore (19)
| John Collins (7)
| Dennis Schroder (11)
| FedExForum15,803
| 6–23
|- style="background:#cfc;"
| 30
| December 18
| Miami
| 
| Taurean Prince (24)
| Taurean Prince (7)
| Kent Bazemore (7)
| Philips Arena14,227
| 7–23
|- style="background:#fcc;"
| 31
| December 20
| Indiana
| 
| John Collins (18)
| John Collins (9)
| Dennis Schroder (8)
| Philips Arena14,830
| 7–24
|- style="background:#fcc;"
| 32
| December 22 
| @ Oklahoma City
| 
| Marco Belinelli (27)
| John Collins (9)
| Kent Bazemore (6)
| Chesapeake Energy Arena18,203
| 7–25
|- style="background:#cfc;"
| 33
| December 23
| Dallas
| 
| Dennis Schroder (33)
| Ersan Ilyasova (7)
| Dennis Schroder (7)
| Philips Arena13,402
| 8–25
|- style="background:#cfc;"
| 34
| December 27
| Washington
| 
| Dennis Schroder (21)
| Ilyasova, Prince (9)
| Bazemore, Schroder (7)
| Philips Arena15,763
| 9–25
|- style="background:#fcc;"
| 35
| December 29 
| @ Toronto
| 
| Taurean Prince (30)
| Taurean Prince (10)
| Dennis Schroder (9)
| Air Canada Centre19,800
| 9–26
|- style="background:#cfc;"
| 36
| December 30
| Portland
| 
| Dennis Schroder (21)
| Taurean Prince (10)
| Dennis Schroder (8)
| Philips Arena15,877
| 10–26

|- style="background:#fcc;"
| 37
| January 2
| @ Phoenix
| 
| Ersan Ilyasova (21)
| Ersan Ilyasova (9)
| Dennis Schroder (5)
| Talking Stick Resort Arena15,921
| 10–27
|- style="background:#fcc;"
| 38
| January 5
| @ Portland
| 
| Dennis Schroder (14)
| Ersan Ilyasova (11)
| Dennis Schroder (4)
| Moda Center19,393
| 10–28
|- style="background:#fcc;"
| 39
| January 7
| @ LA Lakers
| 
| Dennis Schroder (27)
| Ersan Ilyasova (9)
| Dennis Schroder (5)
| Staples Center18,997
| 10–29
|- style="background:#fcc;"
| 40
| January 8
| @ LA Clippers
| 
| Taurean Prince (20)
| Ersan Ilyasova (13)
| Malcolm Delaney (6)
| Staples Center14,624
| 10–30
|- style="background:#cfc;"
| 41
| January 10
| @ Denver
| 
| Dennis Schroder (19)
| Ersan Ilyasova (9)
| Dennis Schroder (10)
| Pepsi Center14,182
| 11–30
|- style="background:#fcc;"
| 42
| January 12
| Brooklyn
| 
| Dennis Schroder (34)
| John Collins (10)
| Dennis Schroder (7)
| Philips Arena13,093
| 11–31
|- style="background:#cfc;"
| 43
| January 15
| San Antonio
| 
| Dennis Schroder (26)
| Dewayne Dedmon (10)
| Dennis Schroder (7)
| Philips Arena15,806
| 12–31
|- style="background:#cfc;"
| 44
| January 17
| New Orleans
| 
| Kent Bazemore (20)
| Dewayne Dedmon (10)
| Dennis Schroder (15)
| Philips Arena10,894
| 13–31
|- style="background:#fcc;"
| 45
| January 20
| Chicago
| 
| Dennis Schroder (18)
| Dewayne Dedmon (11)
| Dennis Schroder (5)
| Philips Arena15,597
| 13–32
|- style="background:#cfc;"
| 46
| January 22
| Utah
| 
| Dennis Schroder (20)
| Ersan Ilyasova (11)
| Malcolm Delaney (8)
| Philips Arena11,096
| 14–32
|- style="background:#fcc;"
| 47
| January 24
| Toronto
| 
| Dennis Schroder (20)
| John Collins (16)
| Malcolm Delaney (4)
| Philips Arena12,780
| 14–33
|- style="background:#fcc;"
| 48
| January 26
| @ Charlotte
| 
| Kent Bazemore (26)
| John Collins (9)
| Malcolm Delaney (6)
| Spectrum Center15,479
| 14–34
|- style="background:#fcc;"
| 49
| January 27
| Washington
| 
| Dedmon, Dorsey, Prince (14)
| Mike Muscala (6)
| Dennis Schroder (7)
| Philips Arena15,843
| 14–35
|- style="background:#cfc;"
| 50
| January 29
| Minnesota
| 
| Kent Bazemore (22)
| John Collins (11)
| Dennis Schroder (11)
| Philips Arena12,589
| 15–35
|- style="background:#fcc;"
| 51
| January 31
| Charlotte
| 
| Kent Bazemore (25)
| Dedmon, Muscala (5)
| Dennis Schroder (9)
| Philips Arena13,103
| 15–36

|- style="background:#fcc;"
| 52
| February 2
| @ Boston
| 
| Taurean Prince (31)
| Taurean Prince (8)
| Malcolm Delaney (5)
| TD Garden18,624
| 15–37
|- style="background:#cfc;"
| 53
| February 4
| @ NY Knicks
| 
| Kent Bazemore (19)
| Dewayne Dedmon (14)
| Malcolm Delaney (8)
| Madison Square Garden19,441
| 16–37
|- style="background:#cfc;"
| 54
| February 6
| Memphis
| 
| Dennis Schroder (22)
| John Collins (10)
| Tyler Dorsey (7)
| Philips Arena11,866
| 17–37
|- style="background:#fcc;"
| 55
| February 8
| @ Orlando
| 
| Schroder, Prince (19)
| John Collins (12)
| Schroder, Prince (5)
| Amway Center16,215
| 17–38
|- style="background:#fcc;"
| 56
| February 9
| Cleveland
| 
| Dennis Schroder (25)
| John Collins (7)
| Schroder, Taylor (4)
| Philips Arena16,438
| 17–39
|- style="background:#cfc;"
| 57
| February 11
| Detroit
| 
| Dennis Schroder (23)
| Dewayne Dedmon (13)
| Dennis Schroder (7)
| Philips Arena15,214
| 18–39
|- style="background:#fcc;"
| 58
| February 13
| @ Milwaukee
| 
| Dennis Schroder (18)
| Dewayne Dedmon (10)
| Bazemore, Schroder, Taylor (4)
| Bradley Center14,720
| 18–40
|- style="background:#fcc;"
| 59
| February 14
| @ Detroit
| 
| Andrew White (15)
| John Collins (10)
| Delaney, Taylor (7)
| Little Caesars Arena15,849
| 18–41
|- style="background:#fcc;"
| 60
| February 23
| @ Indiana
| 
| Isaiah Taylor (17)
| John Collins (9)
| Isaiah Taylor (6)
| Bankers Life Fieldhouse17,923
| 18–42
|- style="background:#fcc;"
| 61
| February 26
| LA Lakers
| 
| Taurean Prince (24)
| John Collins (9)
| Bazemore, Magette (4)
| Philips Arena16,328
| 18–43
|- style="background:#cfc;"
| 62
| February 28
| Indiana
| 
| John Collins (16)
| Dewayne Dedmon (9)
| Bazemore, Schroder (5)
| Philips Arena13,316
| 19–43

|- style="background:#fcc;"
| 63
| March 2
| Golden State
| 
| Kent Bazemore (29)
| John Collins (8)
| Dennis Schroder (9)
| Philips Arena16,728
| 19–44
|- style="background:#cfc;"
| 64
| March 4
| Phoenix
| 
| Taurean Prince (22)
| Miles Plumlee (11)
| Dennis Schroder (6)
| Philips Arena15,166
| 20–44
|- style="background:#fcc;"
| 65
| March 6
| @ Toronto
| 
| Bazemore, Collins (14)
| Dewayne Dedmon (10)
| Kent Bazemore (5)
| Air Canada Centre19,800
| 20–45
|- style="background:#fcc;"
| 66
| March 9
| @ Indiana
| 
| Tyler Dorsey (18)
| Dewayne Dedmon (7)
| Josh Magette (6)
| Bankers Life Fieldhouse17,923
| 20–46
|- style="background:#fcc;"
| 67
| March 11
| Chicago
| 
| Taurean Prince (38)
| Dewayne Dedmon (9)
| Magette, Taylor (8)
| Philips Arena15,266
| 20–47
|- style="background:#fcc;"
| 68
| March 13
| Oklahoma City
| 
| Taurean Prince (25)
| John Collins (9)
| Dennis Schroder (8)
| Philips Arena16,739
| 20–48
|- style="background:#fcc;"
| 69
| March 15
| Charlotte
| 
| Taurean Prince (22)
| Taurean Prince (10)
| Dennis Schroder (8)
| Philips Arena14,486
| 20–49
|- style="background:#fcc;"
| 70
| March 17
| @ Milwaukee
| 
| Taurean Prince (38)
| John Collins (12)
| Dennis Schroder (9)
| Bradley Center18,717
| 20–50
|- style="background:#cfc;"
| 71
| March 20
| @ Utah
| 
| Dennis Schroder (41)
| Dewayne Dedmon (15)
| Dennis Schroder (7)
| Vivint Smart Home Arena18,306
| 21–50
|- style="background:#fcc;"
| 72
| March 22
| @ Sacramento
| 
| Isaiah Taylor (18)
| Dewayne Dedmon (10)
| Lee, Prince (4)
| Golden 1 Center17,583
| 21–51
|- style="background:#fcc;"
| 73
| March 23
| @ Golden State
| 
| Taurean Prince (20)
| Dewayne Dedmon (11)
| Dennis Schroder (7)
| Oracle Arena19,596
| 21–52
|- style="background:#fcc;"
| 74
| March 25
| @ Houston
| 
| Taurean Prince (28)
| John Collins (10)
| Josh Magette (5)
| Toyota Center18,055
| 21–53
|- style="background:#fcc;"
| 75
| March 28
| @ Minnesota
| 
| Mike Muscala (24)
| Dewayne Dedmon (11)
| Isaiah Taylor (8)
| Target Center16,183
| 21–54
|- style="background:#fcc;"
| 76
| March 30
| Philadelphia
| 
| Damion Lee (20)
| Dewayne Dedmon (15)
| Isaiah Taylor (7)
| Philips Arena16,579
| 21–55

|- style="background:#cfc;"
| 77
| April 1
| Orlando
| 
| Isaiah Taylor (19)
| John Collins (11)
| Tyler Dorsey (5)
| Philips Arena13,587
| 22–55
|- style="background:#fcc;"
| 78
| April 3
| @ Miami
| 
| Tyler Dorsey (18)
| John Collins (10)
| Isaiah Taylor (9)
| American Airlines Arena19,600
| 22–56
|- style="background:#fcc;"
| 79
| April 4
| Miami
| 
| Taurean Prince (20)
| Collins, Dedmon (8)
| Collins, Prince (4)
| Philips Arena16,696
| 22–57
|- style="background:#cfc;"
| 80
| April 6
| @ Washington
| 
| Taurean Prince (23)
| Dewayne Dedmon (14)
| Collins, Prince (5)
| Capital One Arena19,557
| 23–57
|- style="background:#cfc;"
| 81
| April 8
| @ Boston
| 
| Taurean Prince (33)
| Lee, Prince (8)
| Isaiah Taylor (6)
| TD Garden18,624
| 24–57
|- style="background:#fcc;"
| 82
| April 10
| Philadelphia
| 
| Taurean Prince (27)
| John Collins (9)
| DeAndre' Bembry (7)
| Philips Arena15,673
| 24–58

Player statistics

|-
| align="left"|† || align="center"| SF
| 37 || 9 || 570 || 81 || 26 || 7 || 5 || 226
|-
| align="left"| || align="center"| SG
| 65 || 65 || 1,789 || 248 || 228 || style=";"|100 || 45 || 836
|-
| align="left"|‡ || align="center"| SG
| 52 || 1 || 1,210 || 100 || 103 || 46 || 3 || 591
|-
| align="left"| || align="center"| SF
| 26 || 3 || 455 || 72 || 49 || 21 || 12 || 136
|-
| align="left"| || align="center"| SF
| 4 || 0 || 10 || 3 || 0 || 0 || 0 || 0
|-
| align="left"|≠ || align="center"| PF
| 39 || 1 || 518 || 127 || 27 || 9 || 4 || 183
|-
| align="left"|≠ || align="center"| SG
| 4 || 0 || 42 || 4 || 0 || 1 || 1 || 13
|-
| align="left"| || align="center"| PF
| 74 || 26 || 1,785 || style=";"|541 || 98 || 47 || style=";"|80 || 777
|-
| align="left"| || align="center"| C
| 62 || 46 || 1,542 || 489 || 90 || 40 || 51 || 617
|-
| align="left"| || align="center"| PG
| 54 || 3 || 1,014 || 100 || 163 || 35 || 6 || 338
|-
| align="left"| || align="center"| SG
| 56 || 5 || 974 || 130 || 79 || 17 || 5 || 405
|-
| align="left"|≠ || align="center"| SF
| 1 || 0 || 5 || 1 || 0 || 0 || 0 || 2
|-
| align="left"|‡ || align="center"| PF
| 46 || 40 || 1,175 || 251 || 51 || 44 || 17 || 501
|-
| align="left"|≠ || align="center"| SG
| 15 || 11 || 404 || 71 || 29 || 19 || 1 || 161
|-
| align="left"| || align="center"| PG
| 18 || 0 || 216 || 19 || 57 || 8 || 1 || 46
|-
| align="left"|≠ || align="center"| SG
| 6 || 0 || 98 || 16 || 7 || 2 || 1 || 28
|-
| align="left"| || align="center"| C
| 53 || 7 || 1,060 || 230 || 51 || 31 || 27 || 405
|-
| align="left"| || align="center"| C
| 55 || 35 || 918 || 228 || 45 || 17 || 30 || 237
|-
| align="left"| || align="center"| SF
| style=";"|82 || style=";"|82 || style=";"|2,464 || 389 || 214 || 85 || 42 || 1,158
|-
| align="left"| || align="center"| PG
| 67 || 67 || 2,078 || 208 || style=";"|417 || 72 || 6 || style=";"|1,301
|-
| align="left"| || align="center"| PG
| 67 || 9 || 1,167 || 94 || 206 || 34 || 10 || 445
|-
| align="left"|≠ || align="center"| SF
| 15 || 0 || 209 || 34 || 6 || 3 || 1 || 69
|}
After all games.
‡Waived during the season
†Traded during the season
≠Acquired during the season

Transactions

Overview

Trades

Free agents

Re-signed

Additions

Subtractions

References

Atlanta Hawks seasons
Atlanta Hawks
Atlanta Hawks
Atlanta Hawks